Nicotiana paniculata, the small-flowered tobacco, is a species of flowering plant in the family Solanaceae, native to western Peru, and introduced to the Canary Islands. It is a parent of the economically important species Nicotiana rustica (Aztec tobacco).

References

paniculata
Endemic flora of Peru
Taxa named by Carl Linnaeus
Plants described in 1753